Bodwannick Manor is a house north of Lanivet in mid Cornwall, England, UK. The gardens are a visitor attraction.

References

External links
Bodwannick Manor; Gardens in Cornwall

Houses in Cornwall